Scott Point (officially Tiriparepa / Scott Point) is a point at the northern end of Ninety Mile Beach in North Auckland, New Zealand. It is the site of a major intertidal green-lipped mussel population.

References

Far North District
Landforms of New Zealand